Henry Cardozo (1830 - 1886) was a carpenter, shipbuilder, county auditor, and state senator in South Carolina.

Early life
Cardozo was born September 1830. Cardozo's mother, Lydia Weston, was African American and Native American, a former slave. His father, Isaac Cardozo, was Sephardic Jewish. He had two sisters, Lydia and Eslander. His brothers Thomas W. Cardozo and Francis Lewis Cardozo were educators and became politicians during the Reconstruction era. Their father was Isaac Cardozo who died in 1855. Henry was working as a shoemaker by age 14. He also worked as a carpenter and shipbuilder. He apprenticed with a manufacturer of threshing machines.

In 1855, he married Catherine F. McKinney in Charleston, SC. His sister Eslander married Catherine's brother Christopher McKinney. In June 1858, he and his family (wife, son, mother, two sisters, brother-in-law, mother-in-law, sister-in-law, nephew) left Charleston, South Carolina on the steamship Nashville for New York.  According to the US census in 1860, his mother and sisters were living together in Cleveland, Ohio, and Henry worked as a tailor in that city and lived with his wife and their sons Isaac (age 4) and William (age 1).

Political career
After the US Civil War ended 1865, he moved back to South Carolina. He served as County Auditor of Charleston County and was elected to the state senate from Kershaw County, serving 1870 to 1874. He also became a Methodist preacher and was later pastor of the Old Bethel United Methodist Church. He moved to Cincinnati, Ohio, and died on February 21, 1886.

He is buried in Randolph Cemetery with eight other Reconstruction era legislators.

References

External links
 

1830 births
1886 deaths
South Carolina state senators
African-American politicians during the Reconstruction Era
African-American state legislators in South Carolina
Burials in South Carolina
American people of Sephardic-Jewish descent
Politicians from Charleston, South Carolina